The 72nd Fighter Squadron is an inactive United States Air Force unit. Its last assignment was with the  56th Operations Group, based at MacDill Air Force Base, Florida. It was inactivated on  19 June 1992.

History

World War II
Established as a defensive interceptor squadron for Hawaii in late 1941.    Suffered tremendous casualties and aircraft losses at Wheeler Field during the Pearl Harbor Attack.   Re-equipped and used as Seventh Air Force training unit; also flew reconnaissance patrols over Hawaii until late 1943.

Deployed to Central Pacific as part of Seventh Air Force island hopping campaign against Japanese in late 1943.   Flew combat missions from Makin Island using P-39 Airacobra fighters until April 1944, returning to Hawaii and being re-equipped and trained with long-range P-51 Mustangs.  Re-deployed to Western Pacific, being stationed on Iwo Jima while battle for the island was still ongoing and engaged in long-range B-29 Superfortress escort missions over Japan; continuing that mission until the end of hostilities in August 1945.  Reassigned to Mariana Islands, as a Far East Air Force fighter squadron, inactivated 1946.

Cold War
Reactivated as Tactical Air Command F-86 jet tactical fighter squadron, 1952  Deployed to France in 1954 as part of NATO; re-equipped with the F-100 Super Sabre 1957.  Ordered out of France by host government as part of France's rejection of NATO's nuclear weapons policy.    Reassigned to Philippines in 1958 for air defense of Luzon.   Inactivated 1959 as a result of budget reductions.   Equipment reassigned to 510th Tactical Fighter Squadron.

Pilot training
Reactivated 1 July 1982 at MacDill AFB, Florida as an F-16A/B Block 10 Fighting Falcon Replacement Training Unit Squadron, replacing the 13th Tactical Fighter Training Squadron when the 58th TFTS transitioned from F-4 Phantom IIs. Tail coded "MC", black tail stripe outlined in white.  Upgraded to the Block 25 and 30 F-16C/D in March 1990 and continued as a Replacement Training Unit.   Inactivated in 1992 as part of the BRAC realignment of MacDill AFB.

Lineage
 Constituted 72nd Pursuit Squadron (Interceptor) on 4 October 1941
 Activated on 5 October 1941
 Re-designated 72nd Fighter Squadron on 15 May 1942
 Inactivated on 10 October 1946
 Redesignated 72nd Fighter-Bomber Squadron on 15 November 1952
 Activated on 1 January 1953
 Inactivated on 8 February 1958
 Re-designated 72nd Tactical Fighter Squadron on 19 May 1958
 Activated on 1 July 1958
 Inactivated on 9 April 1959
 Re-designated 72nd Tactical Fighter Training Squadron, and activated on 1 July 1982
 Re-designated 72nd Fighter Squadron on 1 November 1991
 Inactivated on  19 June 1992

Assignments
 15th Pursuit (later Fighter) Group, 5 October 1941
 318th Fighter Group, 15 October 1942
 21st Fighter Group, 15 June 1944 – 10 October 1946
 21st Fighter-Bomber Group, 1 January 1953 – 8 February 1958
 6200th Air Base Wing, 1 July 1958 – 9 April 1959.
 56th Tactical Training Wing, 1 July 1992
 56th Operations Group, 1 November 1991 – 19 June 1992

Stations

 Wheeler Field, Hawaii Territory, 5 October 1941
 Hilo Field, Hawaii Territory, 25 July 1943
 Wheeler Field, Hawaii Territory, 21 October 1943
 Makin Airfield, Gilbert Islands, 18 December 1943
 Haleiwa Fighter Strip, Hawaii Territory, 23 April 1944
 Mokuleia Field, Hawaii Territory, 8 June 1944
 Central Field, Iwo Jima, 26 March 1945
 South Field, Iwo Jima, 15 July 1945

 Isley Airfield, Saipan, 5 December 1945
 Northwest Field, Guam, 17 April-10 October 1946
 George AFB, California, 1 January 1953 – 26 November 1954
 Châteauroux-Déols Air Base, France, 14 December 1954
 Chambley-Bussières Air Base, France, 9 July 1955 – 8 February 1958
 Clark AB, Luzon, Philippines, 1 July 1958 – 9 April 1959.
 MacDill AFB, Florida, 1 July 1982 – 19 June 1992

Aircraft

 P-40 Warhawk, 1941–1943
 P-39 Airacobra, 1943–1944
 P-38 Lightning, 1944–1945
 P-51 Mustang, 1944–1946

 P-47 Thunderbolt, 1946
 F-51 Mustang, 1953
 F-86 Sabre, 1953–1957
 F-100 Super Sabre, 1958–1959
 F-16 Fighting Falcon, 1982-1992

Emblems

References

 
 Martin, Patrick. Tail Code: The Complete History of USAF Tactical Aircraft Tail Code Markings. Schiffer Publishing, 1994. .
 Rogers, Brian. United States Air Force Unit Designations Since 1978. Hinkley, England: Midland Publications, 2005. .

Military units and formations established in 1942
072
072